Úhorná is a village and municipality in the Gelnica District in the Košice Region of eastern Slovakia. Total municipality population was in 2011 150 inhabitants.

References

External links
 Official homepage

Villages and municipalities in Gelnica District